Historic Savannah: A Survey of Significant Buildings in the Historic and Victorian Districts of Savannah, Georgia is a book published by Historic Savannah Foundation in 1968 and regarded as a seminal work on the architecture of Savannah, Georgia, organized by ward. A second edition was released in 1977 and a third in 2005. The first two editions were edited by Mary Lane Morrison.

Each ward has an illustrated layout of its streets, with the placement of individual buildings.

References 

1968 books
History of Savannah, Georgia
Books about Georgia (U.S. state)